Tarkwa-Nsuaem is one of the constituencies represented in the Parliament of Ghana. It elects one Member of Parliament (MP) by the first past the post system of election. It is located in the Western Region of Ghana.

Member of Parliaments

LIST OF PAST MPs 

George Mireku Duker          2016-2020

Gifty Eugenia Kwofie           2012-2016

Gifty Eugenia Kwofie           2008-2012

Gifty Eugenia Kwofie           2004-2008

Gifty Eugenia Kwofie           2000-2004

Joseph Ghansah                  1996-2000

See also
List of Ghana Parliament constituencies

References 

Parliamentary constituencies in the Western Region (Ghana)